Negeri Lencho is an Ethiopian academic and politician who since 2016 has served as Minister of Communications in the cabinet of Hailemariam Dessalegn, succeeding Getachew Reda.

He completed a master's degree from the English and Foreign Languages University in 2004. He later received his PhD from Andhra University in India in 2011, and went on to teach at Addis Ababa University, serving as Assistant Dean of the Faculty of Language Studies. He previously wrote articles critical of the government's dominance of the domestic media.

References

Living people
21st-century Ethiopian politicians
Andhra University alumni
Academic staff of Addis Ababa University
Year of birth missing (living people)
Government ministers of Ethiopia